The Hook is the third studio album by guitarist Jukka Tolonen, released in 1974 through Love Records; a remastered edition was reissued in 2004.

Track listing

Production

"Aurora Borealis" commences as a brass-dominated exercise in R&B, then switches to an uptempo fusion piece with analog synthesiser solos.  "Starfish" is a lively, elaborate jazz composition originally written by Tolonen for the Pori Jazz Festival in 1974 which allows for extended solos on guitar, trumpet, saxophone, and synthesiser.  "The Sea" is a midtempo jazz piano ballad with full band accompaniment.  "The Hook" begins humorously with guitar strings detuned before launching into its whole tone scale-dominated melody.  "Together" is a sensitive electric guitar and piano ballad.

Personnel
Jukka Tolonen – guitar, piano
Esa Kotilainen – Minimoog, clavinet, accordion
Esko Rosnell – drums, percussion
Heikki Virtanen – bass
Seppo Paakkunainen – baritone saxophone
Jan Kling – tenor saxophone
Pekka Pöyry – alto saxophone, soprano saxophone, flute
Torgny Nilsson – trombone
Bertil Löfgren – trumpet
Måns Groundstöm – production

References

Jukka Tolonen albums
1974 albums
Love Records albums